Futures & Foresight Science is an academic journal published by Wiley. The journal publishes articles dedicated to advancing methods that aid anticipating the future. The journal was established in 2019 by Professor George Wright (Editor in Chief), University of Strathclyde, Professor George Cairns (Associate Editor), Queensland University of Technology and Professor Heiko von der Gracht (Associate Editor), Steinbeis University Berlin.

Areas of interest 
 Scenario planning
 Delphi method
 Forecasting
 Expert judgement in anticipating the future
 Combining group and individual judgements
 Combinations of futures methodologies
 Corporate Foresight

See also 
 Technological Forecasting and Social Change
 Futures
 Journal of Futures Studies
 Foresight

References 

Futurology journals
English-language journals
Publications established in 2018